James Abner Hart (July 10, 1855 – July 18, 1919) was an American baseball manager for the Louisville Colonels and the Boston Beaneaters for parts of three seasons.

Hart went to the U.K. in the 1890s. The professional National League of Baseball of Great Britain was started in 1890 and a letter to Albert Spalding in America requesting help in establishing a league. The British requested eight to ten players to coach and convert the existing players (whose primary game was usually soccer). Spalding sent Hart as a skilled manager and players: William J. Barr, Charles Bartlett, J. E. Prior and Leech Maskrey.

The original intention had been to have eight teams but initially there were just four Aston Villa, Preston North End Baseball Club, Stoke City and Derby Baseball Club, The first three used Jim Hart to decide the line-up of their teams, but Francis Ley at Derby made his own decisions. Hart was a Director of Preston North End Baseball Club Limited.

In 1891 Hart, who was secretary of the Chicago White Stockings (later the Colts and then the Cubs), succeeded Albert G. Spalding as president of the team. Hart was part-owner of the Chicago Colts team, and in the 1895 season, the entire Colts team was arrested for creating a disturbance on Sunday, and Hart bailed every player out.

References

External links 
 
 

1855 births
1919 deaths
Boston Beaneaters managers
Louisville Colonels managers
Sportspeople from Pennsylvania
Chicago Cubs owners
Baseball in the United Kingdom